AGS‑40 Balkan is a Russian 40 mm caseless automatic grenade launcher and successor to AGS-17 and AGS-30, introduced and adopted by the Russian military.

Design 
The AGS-40 uses 40 mm CL (caseless) grenades with a range of 2,500 m (compared to the 30 mm grenades with range 1,700 for AGS-17 and 2,100 for AGS-30) and a rate of fire of 400 rounds per minute, with short burst (5 rounds), long burst (10 rounds), and continuous fire modes. The weapon is usually equipped with a tripod and a PAG-17 2.7× telescopic sight; it can also have back-up iron sights installed.

A unique feature of the AGS-40 is a detachable seat that allows for more stable shooting using the weight of an operator.

Ammunition 
 Caseless high-explosive-fragmentation 40 mm 7P39 grenades.
 7P39P and 7P39U practice rounds

Development 
Development of the AGS-40 started in 1980 but stalled after the dissolution of the Soviet Union and the subsequent economic decline in Russia. However, the project was revived in the early 1990s under the codename "Balkan", and was put into operational evaluation in 2018. State tests were successfully completed and the weapon was recommended for introduction into service as of March 2021. The first serial batch was delivered in January 2022.
AGS-40 can be installed on armored vehicles. The AGS-40 can be integrated with Kalashnikov MBDU remote weapon station.

Users

See also 
 GP-25
 AGS-30
 AGS-17
 Mk 19 grenade launcher
 Daewoo Precision Industries K4
 Mk 47 Striker
 Type 87 grenade launcher
 Type 04 grenade launcher
 Howa Type 96
 Vektor Y3 AGL
 SB LAG 40
 HK GMG, similar weapon
 XM174 grenade launcher
 Milkor MGL, another South African 40 mm grenade launcher
 RGS-50M
 RGSh-30
 RPO Rys
 MRG-1

References 

Grenade launchers of Russia
Automatic grenade launchers
Caseless firearms
Tecmash
Military equipment introduced in the 2010s